The 2006 Army Black Knights football team represented the United States Military Academy as an independent during the 2006 NCAA Division I FBS football season.

Had the Knights been bowl-eligible, they would have been invited to the Poinsettia Bowl, but after a 3–3 start, they lost their last six games to finish 3–9.

Schedule

References

Army
Army Black Knights football seasons
Army Black Knights football